Listed are student newspapers (school, college, and university newspapers). The papers are separated by countries and, where appropriate, states or provinces.

Albania
 University of Tirana – Reporteri

Argentina
University of Buenos Aires – La Res Publica

Armenia 
American University of Armenia - The Bridge

Australia

Austria

Vienna
Webster University Vienna – Jugendstil newspaper
 Universität für Bodenkultur Wien - ÖH_Magazin
 Universität Graz - Libelle

Belgium 
Ghent University – Schamper
University of Antwerp – dwars
Katholieke Universiteit Leuven – Veto
Vrije Universiteit Brussel – De Moeial
Hogeschool Gent – BOX

Canada

Chile 
 Colegio de la Preciosa Sangre de Pichilemu - CC.AA. C.P.S. (2010–13)
 University of Chile - Bello Público

Czech Republic 
Anglo-American University – Lennon Wall
University of New York in Prague – Perception

Egypt 
The Insider Student Newspaper – The Insider Student Newspaper
The German University in Cairo (GUC) – The Insider GUC
The American University in Cairo (AUC) – Caravan
The American University in Cairo (AUC) – The Independent
The Canadian International College (CIC) – The Insider CIC
The Insider Tanta University – The Insider Tanta university

Finland

Helsinki
University of Helsinki – Ylioppilaslehti
Faculty of Social Sciences of the University of Helsinki – Tutkain
Helsinki School of Economics – Kylteri
Helsinki University of Technology – Polyteekkari

Turku
University of Turku – Turun ylioppilaslehti

Tampere
University of Tampere – Aviisi

Germany

Berlin 

 Freie Universität Berlin – FURIOS
 Humboldt Universität zu Berlin - HUMBOLDT
 John F. Kennedy School - JFKS Chronicle

Hamburg
University of Hamburg – INJEKTION. Campusmagazin

Karlsruhe
Karlsruhe Institute of Technology – Karlsruher Transfer

Munich
Munich University – newspeak magazin

Bonn
Aloisiuskolleg – akomag

India

Aligarh, Uttar Pradesh
Aligarh Muslim University – AMU Journal is an independent AMU students run newspaper and online News/Media portal

Rourkela, Odisha
NIT Rourkela – Monday Morning – The Official e-newsletter of NIT Rourkela and accredited as the second largest student media body of India

Ahmedabad, Gujarat
 The School Post, Published by Times Communication is the first independent monthly newspaper for school children.

Raipur, Chhattisgarh
 The Bucket List - Independent Students Magazine of Chhattisgarh

Kanpur, Uttar Pradesh
 Harcourt Butler Technical University - Fortnightly students newsletter The Pulse of HBTU , (Printed form)

Varanasi, Uttar Pradesh
 Banaras Hindu University (BHU) - Mrigtrishna Magazine
World's First Mobile Run Magazine 
Editor-in-chief - Prince Tiwari

Mussoorie, Uttarakhand 

 The Woodstocker - The official online student newspaper of Woodstock School, established in 2017 after a shift from the student print publication, "The Tiger."

Dehradun, Uttarakhand
 The Doon School Weekly – Official newspaper of The Doon School. Established in 1936, it is the oldest publication of Doon.
 Unison Times – Official campus newspaper of IMS Unison University.

New Delhi, Delhi
Spotlight -NIT Delhi Official Newsletter of National Institute Of Technology Delhi
Campus Crunch Magazine – Nationwide College magazine, By Students For Students
Campus Drift - The first Students' newspaper of India Dedicated to Students reaching Colleges each month.
DUBeat.com – Delhi University Independent Online Student Newspaper
The Jamia Review – Jamia Millia Islamia University's Independent Media/News Organization managed exclusively by students. 
 NSIT - The Alliance Independent Online Student Newspaper
TAF Times - The Delhi TAF Times Independently run monthly Student Newspaper
DTU Times-  DTU Times Official newsletter of DTU
Spaced Out – Official student magazine of School of Planning and Architecture, New Delhi.
DU Assassins – Delhi University Student Newspaper

Manipal, Karnataka state
Manipal University The Manipal Journal (abbreviated as TMJ) Independent student-run news website

Indore, Madhya Pradesh 
 Goonj - A Daily Newspaper by The Students of India

Bhopal, Madhya Pradesh
The Campionite– Official Monthly Newspaper of The Campion School Bairagarh

Mumbai, Maharashtra State
Fergusson College – The Ninth Wave
IIT Bombay – INSIGHT – The Third Eye
Sydenham College – SPEAK (A-Mag Presentation)
Somaiya Vidyavihar – VOICES – Your Word, Our Paper
VJTI, Mumbai – VJ.News – The Official VJTI Newsletter

Chandigarh, Punjab 
 PU Mirror, Panjab University 
 PU Pulse, Panjab University

Trivandrum, Kerala 
The Sounding Rocket, Indian Institute of Space Science and Technology

Malappuram, Kerala 
Chilamb, Ponnani – The newspaper is published annually by Art Cafe Club, MES Ponnani College

Chennai, Tamil Nadu
IIT Madras – The Fifth Estate

Tiruchirappalli, Tamil Nadu
NIT Tiruchirappalli – Feeds- The official college magazine and media house of NIT Trichy

Hyderabad
 Elyuxen, independent student-run newspaper   Independent Student-run newspaper in Hyderabad, Warangal, Vijayawada, Tirupathi, Vizag, Chennai, Bangalore, Mumbai, Pune and Mysore

Pune, Maharashtra State
Campus Times Pune, Students' News Blog & College Event Updates in Pune.
TILT - The ILIKE Times, Pune's First Independent Student Tabloid 
The College Times - The Students Voice Platform.

Kolkata, West Bengal 
Jadavpur University-"The JU Journal"

Kharagpur, West Bengal
IIT Kharagpur – The Scholars' Avenue

Haldia, West Bengal 
Haldia Institute of Technology – The HIT Times

Srinagar, Jammu and Kashmir 
 University of Kashmir - The Student Herald

Indonesia
Andalas University – UKPM Genta Andalas Universitas Andalas
Yogyakarta State University – LPM EKSPRESI
Satya Wacana Christian University – Scientiarum, E-Time
Gadjah Mada University – BPPM Balairung
State Institute for Islamic Studies – IDEA
Universitas Kristen Petra – "GENTA-Petra"
Brawijaya University Faculty of Social and Political Science – LPM Perspektif

Iran 
"Ettefagh" Independent Student Journal – Islamic Azad University- Shahreza Branch Student Journal in Isfahan

Iraq
American University of Iraq, Sulaimani – AUIS Voice

Ireland
Ballyfermot College of Further Education – The Ballyfermot Post
Dublin City University – Campus - Official DCUSU Magazine, The College View – Student Newspaper, Flashback - The semesterly review magazine for DCU, St. Patrick's and Mater Dei.
National University of Ireland
University College Cork – UCC Express and Motley Magazine
University College Dublin – The University Observer and The College Tribune
University of Galway – Sin Newspaper
Maynooth University – The Print
University of Dublin
Trinity College Dublin – Trinity News, The University Times
University College Cork
 UCC Express
University of Limerick – An Focal

Japan
Keio University – Mita Campus
The Sentinel - Tohoku University The Sentinel
Chuo University Hakumon Herald
Tokyo City University TCU Press

Jordan
Jordan University of Science and Technology – Just For Just

Lebanon
American University of Beirut – Outlook

Malta
University of Malta – The Insiter

Malaysia
International Islamic University Malaysia – IIUMToday
Universiti Teknologi MARA – Dimensi

Netherlands
University of Amsterdam – Rostra Economica
University of Amsterdam – The Amsterdammer

New Zealand

Auckland University of Technology – Debate
University of Auckland – Craccum
University of Canterbury – Canta
Lincoln University – Caclin
Massey University, Palmerston North campus – Chaff
Massey University, Albany campus – Satellite
Massey University, Wellington campus – Magneto
Otago Polytechnic – Gyro
University of Otago – Critic
Unitec – In Unison
Universal College of Learning – Crew
Victoria University of Wellington – Salient
Waikato University – Nexus
See also Aotearoa Student Press Association

North Macedonia
International Balkan University – WeeklyBalkan

Norway

Oslo
University of Oslo – Universitas
Oslo katedralskole – Kort Sagt
All universities in the Oslo-region – Argument

Trondheim
Norwegian University of Science and Technology – Under dusken

Tromsø
University of Tromsø – Utropia

Bergen
University of Bergen – Studvest

China 
China West Normal University – XiHua Online

Hong Kong
Chinese University of Hong Kong – Student Press (中大學生報)
University of Hong Kong – HKU Post (港大報)
University of Hong Kong – Undergrad (學苑)
Hong Kong University of Science and Technology – Wings (振翅)
Hong Kong Polytechnic University – PolyLife
City University of Hong Kong – City Print

Pakistan
Institute of Business Administration, Karachi, IBA Today

Philippines

Metro Manila
Adamson University – Adamson News, Ugnayan, The Adamson Chronicle
Ateneo de Manila University – The Palladium (Law School), TheGUIDON, (Loyola Schools), Matanglawin (Loyola Schools), Hi-Lites (High School) and The Eaglet (Grade School) 
Claret School of Quezon City – Tanglaw, Claretian
Colegio de San Juan de Letran – The LANCE
De La Salle Araneta University – TINIG
De La Salle College of Saint Benilde – The Benildean
De La Salle University Manila – The LaSallian, Ang Pahayagang Plaridel, Malate Literary Folio, Green & White
Emilio Aguinaldo College – MAGDALO Editorial Board
Eulogio "Amang" Rodriguez Institute of Science and Technology – EARIST Technozette
Far Eastern University – FEU Advocate
Lyceum of the Philippines University – '
Mapúa University – The New Builder
Mater Carmeli School – The Carmelian
Miriam College – Chi Rho Publications
National University (Philippines)  –  The National 
National Teachers College – Fiat Lux
New Era University – Hudyat
Pamantasan ng Lungsod ng Marikina - CPAIPS: Center for Public Affairs, Information and Publication Services and The PLMar Tribune
Pamantasan ng Lungsod ng Maynila – Ang Pamantasan
Pamantasan ng Lungsod ng Muntinlupa - The Warden Publication
Philippine Normal University – The Torch
Philippine State College of Aeronautics VAB Campus - Aeronautica
Polytechnic University of the Philippines – The Catalyst, The Communicator, Junior Managers, Tranvia, The Solicitor (College of Law)
Polytechnic University of the Philippines Taguig – The Chronicler
Rizal Technological University – The Guardian
San Beda College – The Bedan
San Beda University - College of Nursing - The Bedan Lamp
San Sebastian College – Recoletos – The Sebastinian
St. Scholastica's College Manila - The Scholastican, The Blue Flame, The Little Bluestockings
Technological Institute of the Philippines – TIP Voice
Technological University of the Philippines – The Philippine Artisan
Trinity University of Asia – Trinity Observer
Universidad de Manila – Ang Dalubhasa / La Universidad
University of Asia and the Pacific – The Bosun
University of Makati – The Makati Collegian
University of Santo Tomas – The Varsitarian
University of the East – The Dawn
University of the Philippines Diliman – The Philippine Collegian
University of the Philippines Manila – The Manila Collegian

Provincial
Alimodian – Blue Staedler, The Morning Sun (Elemeuhhhhntary), The Hillside Echoes and Ali Mudin (High School)
Ateneo de Cebu – Seeds
Ateneo de Davao University – Atenews (College), Blue Knight (High School) and Magis (Grade School)
Ateneo de Iloilo – Ripples (High School) and Pebbles (Grade School)
Ateneo de Naga University – The PILLARS (College), The Blue and Gold (High School)
Ateneo de Zamboanga University – The Beacon (College), The Blue Eagle (High School) and The Quill (Grade School)
Angeles University Foundation – The Pioneer
Aquinas University of Legazpi – The Phoenix
Araullo University – ViewPoint
Bataan Peninsula State University – The GUILDS (Main campus) The DEFENDER (Balanga campus) The POLYTECHNICIAN (Orani campus), Ang Malasimbo (Dinalupihan campus), The GOLDEN PLOW (Abucay campus), The HERON (Bagac campus)
Bataan Heroes Memorial College – Ang BAYANI
Batangas State University – The LATHE
Benguet State University - The Mountain Collegian
Bicol University of Legazpi – The Bicol Universitarian
Bukidnon State University – The Collegianer
Bulacan Agricultural State College - The Soil Tiller
Bulacan State University – Pacesetter
Camarines Norte State College – Breakthrough
Cavite State University – The Gazette
Cebu Institute of Technology – University – Techno (magazine) GearWatch (newsletter) 
Cebu Normal University – Ang Suga
Cebu Technological University – The Nation Builder
Central Bicol State University of Agriculture (CBSUA) – The STATEANS
Central Philippine University – The Central Echo
De La Salle Lipa – Lavoxa
De La Salle University Dasmariñas – Heraldo Filipino
Don Honorio Ventura Technological State University – The Industrialist
First Asia Institute of Technology and Humanities – The New Lighthouse
Gordon College – The Forefront
Holy Angel University – The Angelite
La Salle University (Ozamiz) - Tingog
Laguna State Polytechnic University (Los Baños) - The Baybreeze
Laguna State Polytechnic University (Santa Cruz) - The Gears
Laguna State Polytechnic University (San Pablo) - Technology Advocate
Laguna State Polytechnic University (Siniloan) - The Baybay Granary
Leyte Normal University (Tacloban) – An Lantawan
Lyceum of the Philippines University (Batangas) – Flambeau
Lyceum of the Philippines University (Laguna) - Voyage
Marinduque State University - The MSUians
Mindanao State University (General Santos) – BAGWIS
Mindanao State University - Iligan Institute of Technology – Silahis (undergraduate) and The Nexus (College of Law - Iligan Extension)
Mindanao State University (Marawi) – The Mindanao Varsitarian
Negros Oriental State University – The NORSUnian
Notre Dame of Jolo College – SULUHAN
Notre Dame RVM-College of Cotabato (Cotabato)- Damyanista (Filipino), The Dame(English), Angel's Diary(Elementary)
Nueva Ecija University of Science and Technology – The Blaze
Palawan State University - Pioneer (College), Practupians (High School), Fresh Ink (Elementary)
Partido State University – Radiance
Polytechnic University of the Philippines Santo Tomas – The Searcher
Ramon Magsaysay Technological University (Iba, Zambales) – The Bastion
Romblon State University – The Harrow, The CAS Torch
Saint Louis University (Philippines) – White and Blue
Saint Mary's University (Philippines) – The MARIAN
Saint Michael's College of Laguna – The Michaelean Herald
San Beda University - Little Bedan (Grade School), Cub Recorder (Junior High School), Bedan Roar (Senior Highschool)
San Pascual National High School (Batangas Province) – "The Bridge"
Siena College of Taytay – The SCENE Today
Silliman University – The Weekly Sillimanian
Southern Luzon State University – The Kingfisher
St. Paul University Philippines – The Paulinian (College), The Pauleen (High School), The Paulinette (Grade School)
Tarlac Agricultural University – Golden Harvest
Tarlac State University – The Work, The Oracle
University of Baguio – The Campus Pulse
University of Batangas – Westernian Advocate
University of Bohol – The Varsitarian
University of Cebu – LAKANDIWA
University of Eastern Philippines – The Pillar
University of Mindanao - Primum
University of Negros Occidental - Recoletos – Tolentine Star
University of Nueva Caceres - Naga City - The DEMOCRAT (College), The Pantograph (Senior High School), The Trailblazer (High School)
University of Perpetual Help System (Laguna) – UPHL Gazette, FIAT Publications (Senior High) 
University of Perpetual Help System Laguna - Dr. Jose G. Tamayo Medical University – Caduceus
University of San Agustin – USA Publications
University of San Jose Recoletos - FORWARD Publications
University of San Carlos – Today's Carolinian
University of Southeastern Philippines (Mabini) – The Stripper
University of Southeastern Philippines (Mintal) – The Vision
University of Southeastern Philippines (Obrero) – The Collegiate Headlight
University of Southeastern Philippines (Bislig) - The Maharlikan
University of Southern Mindanao - The Mindanao Tech
University of St. La Salle (Bacolod) – The Spectrum
University of the Assumption – Regina
University of the Cordilleras – The Alternative
University of the Immaculate Conception – The Collegiate Immaculate
University of the Philippines Baguio – Outcrop
University of the Philippines Cebu College – UP Tug-ani
University of the Philippines Diliman Extension Program in Pampanga – UP Frontliner
University of the Philippines Los Baños – UPLB Perspective
University of the Philippines Mindanao – Himati
University of the Philippines Visayas Tacloban College – UP Vista
Wesleyan University Philippines – Genré (College), The Wesleyanian (High School), The Graders (Grade School)
West Visayas State University – Forum-Dimensions
Western Visayas College of Science and Technology – The Technovator
Xavier University – Ateneo de Cagayan – The Crusader (College), The Squire (Senior High School), PAG-ASA (Junior High School), The Page (Grade School)

Puerto Rico 
School of Communication of the University of Puerto Rico – Diálogo

South Africa

Cape Town
University of Cape Town – Varsity

Grahamstown

KwaZulu-Natal Province
University of KwaZulu-Natal – Nux

Potchefstroom
University of North-West – Wapad

Pretoria
University of Pretoria – Perdeby

Stellenbosch
Stellenbosch University – Die Matie

Singapore
Ngee Ann Polytechnic – npTribune
Nanyang Technological University – Nanyang Chronicle
Nanyang Technological University – The Enquirer
National University of Singapore – The Kent Ridge Common
National University of Singapore – The Campus Observer
Yale-NUS College – The Octant

South Korea
Joongdong High School – The Lion's Pride

Sweden
Lund University – Lundagård
Malmö University College – Mahskara
Umeå University – Vertex
Royal Institute of Technology – Osqledaren

Göteborgs universitet
Götherborgske Spionen

Taiwan
National Chengchi University – Uonline University News Online
 National Taiwan University Student News www.ntusnews.org (臺大學生報)

Thailand
Suankularb Wittayalai School –  Pimsuan

Turkey
 Boğaziçi University - Dinamik Gazete
 Bilkent University - GazeteBilkent
 Istanbul Technical University - Arıyorum

United Arab Emirates
 New York University Abu Dhabi – The Gazelle

United Kingdom

United States

See also 
National Pacemaker Award for college newspapers which have won the National Newspaper Pacemaker.

References 

News